William de Hawkesworth (died 8 April 1349) was an English medieval college head and university chancellor.

On 20 December 1348, William de Hawkesworth was confirmed as Provost of Oriel College, Oxford. In the same year he became Vice-Chancellor of the University of Oxford In 1349, he was briefly Chancellor of the University. He died on 8 April 1349 and there is a brass to him in the chancel of St Mary's Church, Oxford, describing him as "prepositus huius ecclesie" ("provost of the church").

John Wyllyot was elected Chancellor against the University statutes on 20 April 1349 and instead became Chancellor of Exeter.

References

Year of birth unknown
1349 deaths
Provosts of Oriel College, Oxford
Vice-Chancellors of the University of Oxford
Chancellors of the University of Oxford
14th-century English people
14th-century Roman Catholics